José Ángel is a Spanish given name. Some people with the name:

People
 José Ángel Galiñanes (1904-1973), Puerto Rican sports shooter
 José Ángel Espinoza (1919-2015), Mexican singer and actor
 José Ángel Cuerda (born 1934), Spanish politician
 José Ángel Fernández Villa (born 1943), Spanish politician and trade unionist
 José Ángel García (1940-2021), Mexican actor and director
 José Ángel Gurría (born 1950), Mexican politician and diplomat
 José Ángel Egido (born 1951), Spanish actor
 José Ángel Córdova (born 1953), Mexican politician
 José Ángel González Sainz (born 1956), Spanish writer and academic
 José Ángel González Serna (born 1959), Mexican politician
 José Ángel César (born 1978), Cuban athlete
 José Ángel (footballer, born 1985), Spanish football defender
 José Ángel Gascón (born 1985), Spanish football midfielder
 José Ángel Antelo (born 1987), Spanish politician and basketball player
 José Ángel Crespo (born 1987), Spanish football centre-back
 José Ángel (footballer, born March 1989), Spanish football midfielder and centre-back 
 José Ángel (footballer, born September 1989), Spanish football left-back
 José Ángel Bueno (born 1991), Spanish football attacking midfielder
 José Ángel (footballer, born 1992), Spanish football midfielder
 José Ángel Efa (born 1992), Equatoguinean football forward
 José Ángel Carrillo (born 1994), Spanish football forward
 José Ángel Coronel (born 1996), Mexican football forward

See also
 José Ángel (disambiguation)

Spanish masculine given names